Stephen or Steve(n) Franklin may refer to:

Stephen Franklin (Babylon 5), Babylon 5 character
Stephen Franklin (American football) (born 1988), American football linebacker
Stephen T. Franklin, Christian theologian
Steven Franklin (soccer), on All-time Nashville Metros roster
Steve Franklin (American football) in 2007 Dallas Cowboys season
Steve Franklin (musician) in In Cahoots